Chris Fuller (born 7 December 1990 in Kettering) is an English professional squash player. As of August 2021, he was ranked number 292 in the world.

References

1990 births
Living people
English male squash players